Oya Unustası (born 31 March 1988) is a Turkish actress and model. She is known for her starring role as Zeliş Gıpgıp in Kalbim Ege'de Kaldı (2015) and has since been in supporting roles in several series. She was one of the top 20 in the 2013 Miss Turkey competition.

Life and career
Oya Unustası was born in Istanbul, Turkey. Her paternal side of the family originally migrated from Bulgaria, and her maternal side migrated from Thessaloniki. Her parents initially settled in Buca, Izmir before moving to Istanbul. She has two older sisters and an older brother. She studied at the Flute Department of Mimar Sinan Fine Arts University and trained under the Turkish actress Ayla Algan. She preferred acting to music.

Her first film was Losers' Club in 2010. She has since starred in Masum Değiliz and the television series Beyaz Karanfil, Sevdaluk, İzmir Çetesi and Diriliş: Ertuğrul, in the latter playing the role of Sügay Hatun. In 2017 she acted the part of Olivia in the play Çok Satanlar. She currently stars in Hercai, a series broadcast on ATV.

Personal life
Unustası is married to fellow actor Ahmet Tansu Taşanlar.

Theatre
Some of her notable theatre plays:
 2017— Çok Satanlar (Olivia)

Filmography

Awards and nominations

References

External links 
 
 

1988 births
Living people
Turkish film actresses
Turkish television actresses
21st-century Turkish actresses
Turkish female models
Actresses from Istanbul